2 Baddies is the fourth Korean-language studio album (fifth overall) by South Korean boy band NCT 127. It was released on September 16, 2022, by SM Entertainment, and contains 12 tracks in a variety of genres, including the lead single of the same name. The album received positive reviews from critics, who praised the versatility of the tracks that range from hip hop to R&B. On January 30, 2023, the group released a repackaged version of 2 Baddies, titled Ay-Yo, which features three new tracks, including the lead single of the same name. The album has sold a total of 3.2 million copies, becoming NCT 127's second triple million-selling album following Sticker (2021).

Background and release
On August 8, 2022, NCT 127 announced that they would release a new album in September. On August 18, 2022, SM Entertainment confirmed that the release date of NCT 127's new album would be September 16. 2 Baddies was later confirmed to contain 12 tracks, including the lead single of the same name. On September 15, 2022, the music video for "2 Baddies" was pre-released. On September 16, 2022, the album was released physically and digitally worldwide.

NCT 127 announced on December 25 that a repackaged version of the album titled Ay-Yo would be released on January 30, 2023.

Composition
The opening track, "Faster", is a hip-hop dance song with strong bass and a minimal hook. The eponymous lead single, "2 Baddies", is an intense hip-hop dance song. With lyrics describing achieving success by running toward one's goal regardless of the judgment of others, the song combines vocal chants with an addictive synths. "Time Lapse" is a mid-tempo R&B song whose lyrics express feelings of longing for a lover who alternates between reality and dreams. "Crash Landing" is a UK drill-style hip-hop and R&B track depicting someone crash landing into their own love story. "Designer", a hip-hop and R&B song, describes a lover's desire to become a designer in order to make their partner look even more beautiful.

In the middle of the album is a three-part love story: "Gold Dust", "Black Cloud" and "Playback". "Gold Dust" is an emotional R&B song that features a vocoder and lyrics comparing one's feelings toward a lover to a golden ray of light. "Black Clouds" is a mid-tempo R&B song with sad vocal and guitar melodies. Its lyrics express the moment two lovers accidentally reunite in an achromatic landscape of dark clouds on a rainy day, like the protagonist of a black-and-white film. Rounding off the love story, "Playback" is an uptempo pop song with a trap beat, 808 bass and an edgy keyboard sound. Its lyrics depict a tug-of-war of the heart between the narrator's lover and his ex.

"Tasty" is a hip-hop song that instills confidence with heavy synth bass and energetic singing about killing villains in nightmares effortlessly. "Vitamin" is a 90s-style hip-hop song in which the narrator promises to be like a vitamin in another's life and stay by their side through hard times. "LOL" is a neo soul pop song with jazz guitar riffs and 808 beats that create a bright atmosphere and convey a message of comfort, support and encouragement to laugh out loud when one feels tired. The final song of the album, "1, 2, 7 (Time Stops)" is a funky 90s groove-based up-tempo pop song. The title and lyrics reference the group's name, NCT 127, and the song is dedicated to their fans with a message describing the sensation of time stopping when you are with the one you love.

Promotion
2 Baddies was teased with a concept trailer titled "Gear Up", released on August 18, 2022, depicting a car with the number 127 on its hood and the album title on its roof and the group members wearing glow-in-the-dark outfits. NCT 127 held a comeback show to commemorate the album's release offline at KINTEX 7Hall and live-streamed via Beyond Live. The group will also hold concerts in Los Angeles and New York to promote the album in North America, as part of their Neo City – The Link tour. Member Mark noted at the album release press conference that the tour setlist would be revised to include songs from 2 Baddies.

Commercial performance 
2 Baddies surpassed more than 1.5 million sales in the first week of release, breaking their previous record of 929,516 copies for Sticker In the United States, 2 Baddies debuted at number 3 of the Billboard 200 chart on the first week of release, selling a total of 58,000 units making the album their third Top 10 entry.

Track listing

Notes
  Additional arrangement

Charts

Weekly charts

Monthly charts

Year-end charts

Sales and certifications

Release history

References

2022 albums
Korean-language albums
NCT 127 albums
SM Entertainment albums